The Brother Tour was the first tour by Irish boy band Boyzone following the death of Stephen Gately.

Background
At first the band were uncertain about promoting Brother but due to the album's success they decided to go on tour. The act included their entire discography as well as the newer songs from the brother album. They promoted the tour on various television shows.
The band attempted to have a hologram of Stephen Gately but this wasn't possible.

Show incidents and events
Keith Duffy fell through a trap door at the Cardiff show but he continued the performance.  A subsequent check at the hospital revealed nothing broken.

Support acts
Barbarellas 
Wonderland – (Select dates)
Guy Sebastian – (Select dates)
The Saturdays – (Edinburgh)
Shayne Ward – (Inverness)

A Huge contribution to the background and lead vocals has come from backing vocalist Jo Garland who has sung with Ronan Keating in his solo ventures since 2001 and with Boyzone since 2008, her vocals have been more prominent often covering for vocals that Stephen Gately sung.

Setlist
Too Late for Hallelujah
Love is a Hurricane
Picture of You
All That I Need
Ruby
Words
When the Going Gets Tough
Gave It All Away
Better
One More Song
Til the Sun Goes Down
Love Me for a Reason
No Matter What
You Needed Me
Love You Anyway
Lovin' Each Day
Let Your Wall Fall Down
Right Here Waiting
Baby Can I Hold You
Life is a Rollercoaster

Tour dates

Box office score date

References

External links

2011 concert tours
Boyzone